The National Championship I (also DHL Nemzeti Bajnokság I for sponsorship reasons) is the second level of domestic club rugby union in Hungary after the Extraliga. There is promotion and relegation involved between National Championship I and the next level down, National Championship II (the second division).

Format and structure
Eight teams take part and the competition is composed of a single league. Each team plays every other team.

Teams are awarded four points for a win, a bonus point for scoring four or more tries, and a bonus point for losing by seven points or less.

Current teams
2011-12 season

Champions
 1990
 1991
 1992
 1993 Zöld Sólymok
 1994 Elefántok
 1995 Elefántok
 1996 Elefántok
 1997 Battai Bulldogok
 1998 Kecskeméti Atlétika és Rugby Club
 1999 Esztergomi Vitézek
 2000 Esztergomi Vitézek
 2001 Esztergomi Vitézek
 2002 Esztergomi Vitézek
 2003 Esztergomi Vitézek
 2004 Esztergomi Vitézek
 2005 Esztergomi Vitézek
 2006 Esztergomi Vitézek
 2007 Esztergomi Vitézek
 2008 Esztergomi Vitézek
 2009 Battai Bulldogok
 2010 Battai Bulldogok

Notes and references

See also
Rugby union in Hungary

Rugby union leagues in Europe
Rugby union leagues in Hungary
Hungary
1989 establishments in Hungary
Sports leagues established in 1989
Professional sports leagues in Hungary